"The Heart Gently Weeps" is the first single from the 2007 album 8 Diagrams by the Wu-Tang Clan. The song interpolates the Beatles' song "While My Guitar Gently Weeps". It features guest appearances from three other musicians: R&B singer Erykah Badu sings the song's chorus; Dhani Harrison, son of Beatle lead guitarist and vocalist George, plays acoustic guitar; and John Frusciante of the Red Hot Chili Peppers is featured on lead guitar. This song was made using a cover version of the George Harrison song played by the blues guitarist Jimmy Ponder.

Out of respect for George Harrison, RZA, who produced this song, asked Dhani to play rhythm guitar. It was played using a mint condition Gretsch guitar from 1961 which was given to RZA as a gift from Russell Crowe after they had finished filming American Gangster.

The song was #50 on Rolling Stones list of the 100 Best Songs of 2007.

Chart position

References

External links
 

2007 songs
2007 singles
Wu-Tang Clan songs
Song recordings produced by RZA
Songs written by Method Man
Songs written by George Harrison